The Aliens is a British science fiction television series created by Fintan Ryan. It is set 40 years after aliens land in the Irish Sea and are reluctantly integrated into British society in the fictional city of Troy. Border guard Lewis Garvey, played by Michael Socha, is caught up in the criminal underbelly of Troy as he learns he is himself half-alien.

The six-episode series also stars Michaela Coel, Michael Smiley and Jim Howick, and is produced by Clerkenwell Films for E4. The first episode was released on 8 March 2016. Ryan had previously written BBC shows Never Better and In the Flesh.

Overview
Coel told Radio Times that The Aliens addresses "urgent contemporary concerns" not limited to racism; during the filming of the series at Nu Boyana Film Studios in Bulgaria, she reported she experienced racist attacks. Speaking to The Guardian's Gabriel Tate, Ryan acknowledged links with the show's narrative and the ongoing European migrant crisis: "With immigrants, there's a colonial history that leaves you in debt to them. Here, we don't owe them [the aliens] anything, but they've landed on our planet and we've got to do something with them."

Viral marketing for The Aliens was organised by Channel 4's in-house creative agency 4Creative. Centred on the slogan "Fight Human Oppression", the faux-political campaign interrupted several Channel 4 shows throughout February 2016. It also appeared on radio and cinema, interrupting DCM's usual ident. Shots featured a female member of the "Alien League" asking the viewer for help "fighting human oppression", before being wrestled away.

Broadcast
Following its April conclusion, the show also aired on Space in Canada in May. It concluded on 8 June 2016. In Germany, ZDFneo aired the show in October 2016.

Cast and characters
Michael Socha as Lewis Garvey
Jim Howick as Dominic 
Michaela Coel as LilyHot
Michael Smiley as Antoine Berry
Holli Dempsey as Holly Garvey
Trystan Gravelle as Fabien
Chanel Cresswell as Paulette
Chetna Pandya as Chief

Episodes

Reception
The List's Brian Donaldson compared the show to the 2015 Humans, and wrote that "from almost its opening scene, The Aliens dives headlong into the issues it wants to tackle... politicians talking about building walls is barely off the news just now and The Aliens taps right into this." Tim Dowling of The Guardian called "Tremendous fun."

Channel 4 announced in May 2016 that The Aliens would not be renewed for a second series.

References

External links

Aliens, The
Aliens, The
Aliens, The
Aliens, The
Aliens, The
Aliens, The
Aliens, The
Aliens, The
Television series by Clerkenwell Films
Aliens, The
British fantasy television series